C. S. Amudhan (born 19 July 1977) is an Indian filmmaker and lyricist from the Tamil film industry.

Career
Amudhan made his cinematic debut as a lyricist with Minnale (2001), where he wrote the song "Maddy Maddy". He made his directorial debut with Thamizh Padam, the first full-length spoof film on Tamil cinema, with Shiva playing the lead role. The film, distributed by Dayanidhi Azhagiri's Cloud Nine Movies, released on 29 January 2010 and won critical acclaim and commercial success at the box office, earning cult status. In late 2010, he began work on a film titled Nakka Mukka starring Vijay Antony in the lead role describing that it would be another film in a "new genre", however the film failed to progress. Furthermore, in October 2011, it was rumoured that Amudhan was working on a film titled Thalavali which would feature lookalikes of leading actors Vijay and Ajith Kumar in the lead roles; the director later denied the claims.

He later announced that his second film would be Rendavathu Padam, another full-length comic entertainer, featuring Vimal, Remya Nambeesan, Aravind Akash and Richard in the lead roles, however despite completing production in 2014 it remains unreleased. The sequel  Thamizh Padam 2 got released in 2018.

Personal life
His wife is Ahalya, daughter of Dindigul Leoni.

Filmography

As director

As lyricist

As dubbing artist

References

1977 births
Living people
Film directors from Chennai
Tamil film directors
Tamil film poets